On 2 September 2022, a police vehicle hit a bomb near the town of Corozal, killing seven police officers and injuring another.

Bombing
On 2 September 2022, a police vehicle caring Eight police officers was traveling to a social welfare event in the town of San Luis, while traveling through the small town of  Corozal, the vehicle hit a bomb. the Vehicle was destroyed and flipped over on its top. The Explosion killed seven of the police officers instantly and severely injured another one.

Colombian president Gustavo Petro said in a tweet that the bombing was an attempt to “sabotage” the peace process. A FARC dissident group under command of Iván Mordisco claimed responsibility for the attack stating it was revenge for the killing of four of it's members in a recent clash with police.

References 

Colombian conflict
Huila Department
September 2022 events in Colombia
Improvised explosive device bombings in 2022
2022 murders in Colombia
Terrorist incidents in South America in 2022
Mass murder in 2022
Terrorist incidents in Colombia in the 2020s
September 2022 crimes in South America